Sweet Poppa Lou is a 1981 album by jazz saxophonist Lou Donaldson, his first recording for the Muse label, featuring Donaldson's quartet with Herman Foster, Calvin Hill, Idris Muhammad, and additional percussion on three tracks by Ralph Dorsey.

Reception
The album was awarded three stars in an Allmusic review.

Track listing
All compositions by Lou Donaldson except where noted
 "Mambo Inn" (Mario Bauzá, Edgar Sampson, Bobby Woodlen)     
 "You'll Never Know" (Harry Warren, Mack Gordon)     
 "Mo' Gravy"      
 "If I Should Lose You" (Ralph Rainger, Leo Robin)     
 "Shuckin' Blues"      
 "Don't Take Your Love from Me" (Henry Nemo)

Personnel
Lou Donaldson - alto saxophone
Herman Foster - piano
Calvin Hill - bass
Idris Muhammad - drums
Ralph Dorsey - percussion (tracks 1-3)

References

Lou Donaldson albums
1981 albums
Muse Records albums
Albums recorded at Van Gelder Studio